André Boucourechliev (28 July 1925 – 13 November 1997) was a French composer of Bulgarian origin.

Born in Sofia, Boucourechliev studied piano at the Conservatory there. Subsequently, he studied in Paris at the École Normale de Musique de Paris, where he later taught piano. His first attempts at composition date from 1954, when he was engaged in the famous contemporary music sessions at Darmstadt. He honed his compositional technique by seeking out Berio and Maderna in Milan. Following the success of his Piano Sonata (1959), which was performed at the Domaine musical, and works involving choice and chance, he spent a period in America, during which he met Cage, Merce Cunningham, and Rauschenberg. The summit of his exploration of choice and freedom on the part of the performer was reached in Archipels (1967–1971). Many of his later works have gone on to refine or extend these principles. Boucourechliev died in Paris in 1997 at the age of 72.

Honours
 Grand Prix Musical de la Ville de Paris, 1976
 Grand Prix National de la Musique, 1984
 Commandeur des Arts et des Lettres
 Chevalier de la Légion d'honneur

Works

Writings
 Schumann, 1956 (French), 1959 (English), 2010 (Bulgarian)
 Chopin: eine Bildbiographie, 1962 (German), 1963 (English)
 Beethoven, 1963 (French)
 Stravinsky, 1982 (French), 1987 (English)
 Essai sur Beethoven, 1991
 Le langage musical, 1993
 Dire la musique, 1995
 Regards sur Chopin, 1996 (French), 2010 (Bulgarian)

 Debussy. La révolution subtile, 1998 (French),

External links
www.boucourechliev.com: Official site of the contemporary music composer, the André Boucourechliev Foundation, and the Association "Les Amis d'André Boucourechliev".
: Orange Factory psychoacoustic arts – the Bulgarian publisher of André Boucourechliev's books.
 

1925 births
1997 deaths
20th-century classical composers
French classical composers
French male classical composers
École Normale de Musique de Paris alumni
Musicians from Sofia
Bulgarian emigrants to France
Commandeurs of the Ordre des Arts et des Lettres
Chevaliers of the Légion d'honneur
20th-century French composers
Twelve-tone and serial composers
20th-century French male musicians